Brockley railway station serves the south-east London district of Brockley and is on the main railway line between  and . It is  down the line from London Bridge.

The station is operated by London Overground, with London Overground and Southern trains serving the station. Thameslink and some Southern services pass through the station. It is in Travelcard Zone 2.

History

The line was part of the London and Croydon Railway which opened in 1839.

At this location adjacent to Brockley station was sited  station which closed in 1917 with the original London, Chatham and Dover Railway branch to Greenwich Park. The connection of that line to Lewisham is a later development. The possibility of opening platforms on this line with direct access to Victoria Station and the Bexleyheath Line to Dartford has often been suggested, and a proposal to create a new Brockley Interchange station is included in the London Borough of Lewisham's 2019-2041 transport strategy, though with no funding as yet identified for the project.

Neither of these other lines has a physical connection with Brockley station, despite the trains running over the station.

Brockley forms part of the new southbound extension of the East London line that opened on 23 May 2010 and forms part of the London Overground network. Ticket barriers were installed at this time.

Services

Services at Brockley are operated by Southern and London Overground using  and  EMUs.

The typical off-peak service in trains per hour is:
 2 tph to 
 8 tph to  via 
 2 tph to  via 
 4 tph to 
 4 tph to 

Connections
London Buses routes 171, 172, 484 and night route N171 serve the station.

References

External links

Railway stations in the London Borough of Lewisham
Former London, Brighton and South Coast Railway stations
Railway stations in Great Britain opened in 1871
Railway stations served by London Overground
Railway stations served by Govia Thameslink Railway